Víctor Ruiz Abril (born 2 November 1993) is a Spanish professional footballer who plays for Saudi Arabian club Al-Fayha as a forward.

Club career
Born in Utiel, Ruiz graduated from the youth academy of local Valencia CF and made his senior debut with CD Utiel in the 2012–13 season, in Tercera División. On 26 July 2014, he moved to Segunda División B side CD Olímpic de Xàtiva. On 19 April 2015, he scored his first goal for the club in a 2–2 draw against Villarreal CF B. On 13 July 2015, he moved to Valencia CF Mestalla in the same tier.

On 17 September 2016, Ruiz returned to Tercera after signing with UD Alzira. In the following two seasons, he continued his career in the same tier with Yeclano Deportivo and SD Formentera.

On 9 December 2018, Ruiz moved abroad and joined Swiss Super League club St. Gallen on a contract running from 2019 until the summer of 2021. On 2 June 2020, he extended his contract with the club until 2023.

On 2 August 2022, Ruiz joined Saudi Arabian club Al-Fayha on a two-year deal.

References

External links

FC St. Gallen profile

1993 births
Living people
Footballers from Valencia (city)
Association football forwards
Segunda División B players
Tercera División players
CD Olímpic de Xàtiva footballers
Valencia CF Mestalla footballers
UD Alzira footballers
Yeclano Deportivo players
Swiss Super League players
FC St. Gallen players
Saudi Professional League players
Al-Fayha FC players
Spanish expatriate footballers
Spanish expatriate sportspeople in Switzerland
Expatriate footballers in Switzerland
Spanish expatriate sportspeople in Saudi Arabia
Expatriate footballers in Saudi Arabia
Spanish footballers
SD Formentera players